Tim Clark or Timothy Clark may refer to:

Tim Clark (airline executive), President of Emirates Airline
Tim Clark (comedian), British comedian, writer and presenter
Tim Clark (golfer) (born 1975), South African golfer
Tim Clark (jockey) (born 1986), jockey from Australia
Tim Clark (soccer) (born 1959), retired American professional soccer player
Tim Clark (pastor), Senior Pastor of The Church On The Way
Tim Clark (artist) (born 1945), Canadian artist
Tim Clark (physician) (1935–2020), British pulmonary physician
Timothy J. Clark (artist) (born 1951), American painter
T. J. Clark (art historian) (Timothy James Clark, born 1943), British art historian and writer
Forrester Clark (born 1934), known as Tim, American politician

See also
Timothy Clarke (disambiguation)
T. J. Clark (racing driver) (born 1962), NASCAR driver